The 2008 FA Women's Cup Final was the 38th final of the FA Women's Cup, England's primary cup competition for women's football teams. It was the 15th final to be held under the direct control of the Football Association (FA). The final was contested between Arsenal and Leeds United at the City Ground on 5 May 2008. It was Arsenal's third successive FA Cup triumph, their ninth in total and their 29th major trophy in just 16 years. Leeds made their second final appearance, after losing 5–0 to Arsenal in 2006. The match was attended by a crowd of 24,582.

Match

Summary
Having just sealed their fifth successive Premier League title and having suffered only one defeat in more than two years of domestic football, Arsenal came into the game as favourites. Arsenal dominated from start to finish, with Smith and Sanderson both drawing saves from Carly Telford in the opening 10 minutes. Karen Carney was also denied from close range on the quarter-hour mark, while Alex Scott was thwarted by a double save by Telford after Smith had put her through with a defence-splitting pass midway through the first half. Leeds' Amanda Barr scored after 32 minutes, but her lob was ruled out for off-side.

Eight minutes after the restart, striker Kelly Smith scored the opener with a 12-yard shot. Six minutes later, Ludlow poked home a 59th-minute effort from close range and within 60 seconds Lianne Sanderson's deflected effort flew into the net as well. Leeds' right-winger Jessica Clarke scored with 20 minutes remaining, but Arsenal quickly regained the initiative and almost extended their lead on 72 minutes when Ludlow's header was cleared off the line by Amanda Barr, and Julie Fleeting also came close with 10 minutes to go. Smith tapped in her second goal seven minutes from time after Fleeting's shot had rebounded off a post.

Details

References

2008
2007–08 in English women's football
FA Women's Cup Final, 2008
FA Women's Cup Final